Putti Plutti Pott and Santa's Beard (original Norwegian title:  Putti Plutti Pott og Julenissens Skjegg) is a Norwegian children's musical written by Per Asplin. It has become a Norwegian cultural institution. It originally appeared as a Christmas album in 1969, but in 1970 NRK, the Norwegian national broadcaster, televised a staged version starring Asplin.  This version was broadcast every year for decades.  In 1987 Asplin again starred in a traveling big-budget stage production. This continued until his death in 1996.  There are now annual productions in many Norwegian cities throughout the holiday season.

Story
Putti Plutti Pott, who is Santa's grandchild, steals Santa's beard while it's hanging out to dry.  He is transported from Nisseland (Santa's Village) to our world.  If he doesn't get back with the beard, Christmas won't come.

References

Sources
http://www.oslospektrum.no/putti-plutti-pott.272036-30696.html

External links

 Authorized stage production web site

Norwegian children's television series
Musicals based on television series
NRK original programming
1970s in Norwegian television
1970s Norwegian television series